Freedom Air (legally Freedom Air International) was a New Zealand low-cost airline which operated since 8 December 1995 to March 2008. It was part of the Air New Zealand Group which ran scheduled passenger services from New Zealand to Australia and Fiji and charter services within New Zealand. Its main hub was Auckland Airport.

History

The airline was established in 1995 as a response to the commencement of discount services between Australia and New Zealand by Kiwi Travel International Airlines and started operations on 8 December 1995 with a single Boeing 757-200. It was ordinally formed as South Pacific Air Charters by Mount Cook Airline and renamed to Freedom Air International in 1998.

By 2004, its fleet had expanded to five Boeing 737-300 aircraft and it was providing direct non-stop services to the Australian cities of Brisbane, Gold Coast, Newcastle, Sydney, Cairns and Melbourne from Hamilton, Auckland, Wellington, Christchurch, Dunedin and Palmerston North. Flights to Fiji were also operated. It briefly operated on the New Zealand main trunk domestic routes such as Auckland–Christchurch, but ceased these services to concentrate on providing value trans-Tasman flights.

In June 2006, the aircraft from Freedom Air were combined with Air New Zealand's fleet of Airbus A320-200 under the air operator's certificate of Zeal320, which was then the sole operator of the Air New Zealand Group's Airbus fleet. When the airline ceased Zeal320 had one aircraft painted in Freedom Air livery. As such, Freedom Air has no aircraft or current air operator's certificate, and Freedom Air is no longer an operational entity.

Air New Zealand ceased all Freedom Air operations from the end of March 2008.

Destinations
Throughout its existence, Freedom Air flew to six destinations in New Zealand, five in Australia and one in Fiji. When the airline shut down on 30 March 2008, all services were replaced by Air New Zealand flights, with the exception of flights out of Palmerston North, which left the airport without any international services. Flights to Nadi and Newcastle were withdrawn prior to 2008.

Brisbane (Brisbane Airport)
Gold Coast (Gold Coast Airport)
Melbourne (Melbourne Airport)
Newcastle (Newcastle Airport)
Sunshine Coast (Sunshine Coast Airport)
Sydney (Sydney Airport)

Nadi (Nadi International Airport)

Auckland (Auckland Airport) Hub
Christchurch (Christchurch Airport)
Dunedin (Dunedin Airport)
Hamilton (Hamilton Airport)
Palmerston North (Palmerston North Airport)
Wellington (Wellington Airport)

Fleet

Freedom Air had operated the following aircraft:

See also
 List of defunct airlines of New Zealand
 History of aviation in New Zealand

References

External links

Freedom Air
Freedom Air pictures
Details on AviationPage New Zealand

Air New Zealand
Defunct airlines of New Zealand
Defunct low-cost airlines
Airlines established in 1995
Airlines disestablished in 2008